The 1972–73 Toronto Maple Leafs season was Toronto's 56th season in the National Hockey League (NHL). The Leafs slipped to sixth place in the East and missed the playoffs.

Offseason
Toronto lost Bernie Parent, Rick Ley, Brad Selwood, Guy Trottier and Larry Pleau, who jumped to the new World Hockey Association (WHA).

Regular season

Final standings

Schedule and results

Player statistics

Regular season
Scoring

Goaltending

Awards and records

Transactions
The Maple Leafs have been involved in the following transactions during the 1972–73 season.

Trades

Free agents

Draft picks
Toronto's draft picks at the 1972 NHL Amateur Draft held at the Queen Elizabeth Hotel in Montreal, Quebec.

Farm teams

See also
 1972–73 NHL season

References

External links

Toronto Maple Leafs season, 1972-73
Toronto Maple Leafs seasons
Toronto